Fortune Peak is a  mountain summit located along the common border of Kittitas County and Chelan County, in Washington state. Fortune Peak is the second-highest point in the Teanaway area of the Wenatchee Mountains. Precipitation runoff from the peak drains northwest into Fortune Creek, a tributary of Cle Elum River; south into tributaries of Teanaway River; or east into Ingalls Creek which is part of the Wenatchee River drainage basin. This peak is unofficially named for its position at the head of Fortune Creek. This creek was where the Queen of the Hills and Ruby Mines were located. Queen of the Hills was a lode gold mine, whereas the Ruby Mine produced antimony, copper, lead, and silver with a by-product of gold.

Climate
Lying east of the Cascade crest, the area around Fortune Peak is a bit drier than areas to the west. Summers can bring warm temperatures and occasional thunderstorms. Most weather fronts originate in the Pacific Ocean, and travel east toward the Cascade Mountains. As fronts approach, they are forced upward by the peaks of the Cascade Range, causing them to drop their moisture in the form of rain or snowfall onto the Cascades (Orographic lift). As a result, the eastern slopes of the Cascades experience lower precipitation than the western slopes. During winter months, weather is usually cloudy, but, due to high pressure systems over the Pacific Ocean that intensify during summer months, there is often little or no cloud cover during the summer.

Geology
The Alpine Lakes Wilderness features some of the most rugged topography in the Cascade Range with craggy peaks and ridges, deep glacial valleys, and granite walls spotted with over 700 mountain lakes. Geological events occurring many years ago created the diverse topography and drastic elevation changes over the Cascade Range leading to the various climate differences.

The history of the formation of the Cascade Mountains dates back millions of years ago to the late Eocene Epoch. With the North American Plate overriding the Pacific Plate, episodes of volcanic igneous activity persisted.  In addition, small fragments of the oceanic and continental lithosphere called terranes created the North Cascades about 50 million years ago.

During the Pleistocene period dating back over two million years ago, glaciation advancing and retreating repeatedly scoured the landscape leaving  deposits of rock debris. The last glacial retreat in the Alpine Lakes area began about 14,000 years ago and was north of the Canada–US border by 10,000 years ago. The “U”-shaped cross section of the river valleys are a result of that recent glaciation. Uplift and faulting in combination with glaciation have been the dominant processes which have created the tall peaks and deep valleys of the Alpine Lakes Wilderness area.

See also

 List of peaks of the Alpine Lakes Wilderness
 Geology of the Pacific Northwest

References

External links
 Fortune Peak weather: National Weather Service
 Alpine Lakes Wilderness (Okanogan-Wenatchee National Forest) U.S. Forest Service

Mountains of Chelan County, Washington
Mountains of Kittitas County, Washington
Mountains of Washington (state)
Wenatchee National Forest
Cascade Range
North American 2000 m summits